Erkin Vohidov  (December 28, 1936 – May 30, 2016) was an Uzbek poet, playwright,  literary translator, and statesman. In addition to writing his own poetry, Vohidov translated the works of many famous foreign poets, such as Aleksandr Tvardovsky, Johann Wolfgang von Goethe, Muhammad Iqbal, Rasul Gamzatov, and Sergey Yesenin into the Uzbek language. Particularly noteworthy are his translations of Yesenin's works and Goethe's Faust.

In 1983, Vahidov was awarded the State Hamza Prize. He became a People's Poet of Uzbekistan in 1987. In 1999, he was awarded the title Hero of Uzbekistan, the highest honorary title that can be bestowed on a citizen by Uzbekistan.

Vohidov's poems remain popular and are frequently published in anthologies. Dozens of his poems have been set to music by various artists, mostly notably by Sherali Joʻrayev. On occasion of the 75th anniversary of the United Nations in October 2020, a song entitled "Human" and based on Vohidov's poem "Inson" ("Human") was released with lyrics in Arabic, English, Italian, Kazakh, Russian, Tajik, Turkish and Uzbek.

Life
Erkin Vohidovich Vohidov was born on December 28, 1936, in Oltiariq District, Fergana Region, then the Uzbek Soviet Socialist Republic. His father, Choʻyanboy Vohidov, fought in the Soviet-German war against Nazi Germany and its allies and died in Tashkent after his return from the war. Vohidov was nine years old at the time. He reminisced about the hardships of the war years as follows:

In 1945, Vohidov moved to Tashkent with his mother, Roziyaxon Vohidova, who also soon passed away. He was raised by his uncle, Karimboy Sohiboyev. It was Vohidov's uncle who sparked his interest in poetry:

After graduating from the National University of Uzbekistan (then Tashkent State University) with a degree in philology in 1960, he started working at various publishing houses. Vohidov died on May 30, 2016, at the age of 79.

Work

Vohidov worked as an editor at Yosh Gvardiya, the Uzbek branch of Molodaya Gvardiya, from 1960 to 1963. He also worked as editor-in-chief at the same publishing house from 1975 to 1982. Vohidov also served as editor-in-chief (1963-1970) and director (1985-1987) of Gʻafur Gʻulom, another publishing house in Tashkent. From 1982 until 1985, he worked as the head of the monthly periodical Yoshlik (Childhood). After Uzbekistan gained independence, he worked as chairman of the Committee on International Affairs and Inter-parliamentary Relations of the Oliy Majlis of Uzbekistan (1995-2005) and chairman of the Senate Committee on Science, Education, Culture and Sport (2005-2009).

Vohidov started writing poetry during his student years. His first poem was published in the Mushtum magazine when he was fourteen years old. Vohidov's first collection of poems, Tong nafasi (The Breath of Morning), was published in 1961. In 1987, he published a collection of literary essays entitled Shoiru, sheʼru shuur: Adabiy esselar (The Poet, the Poem, and the Mind: Literary Essays). Vohidov wrote three plays, namely, Oltin devor (The Golden Wall), Istanbul fojiasi (The Istanbul Tragedy), and Ikkinchi tumor (The Second Talisman). His play Oltin devor was staged in Lahore, Pakistan.

Poetry collections
The following is a list of Vohidov's books of poetry: 
Tong nafasi (The Breath of Morning) (1961)
Qoʻshiqlarim sizga (My Songs are for You) (1962)
Yurak va aql (The Heart and the Mind) (1963)
Mening yulduzim (My Star) (1964)
Nido (The Appeal) (1965)
Lirika (Lyricism) (1965)
Palatkada yozilgan doston (The Poem That was Written in a Tent) (1967)
Yoshlik devoni (The Diwan of Youth) (1969)
Charogʻbon (1970)
Quyosh maskani (The Land of the Sun) (1972)
Dostonlar (Poems) (1973)
Muhabbat (Love) (1976)
Tirik sayyoralar (The Living Planets) (1978)
Ruhlar isyoni (The Rise of the Spirits) (1980)
Sharqiy qirgʻoq (The East Coast) (1980)
Kelajakka maktub (A Letter to the Future) (1983)
Bedorlik (Insomnia) (1985)
Hozirgi yoshlar (The Youth of Today) (1986)
Saylanma (Selected Works)
Birinchi jild: Muhabbatnoma (Volume I: Muhabbat-Name) (1986)
Ikkinchi jild: Sadoqatnoma (Volume II: Sadakat-Name) (1986)
Daraxtlar suhbati (The Talk of the Trees) (1988)
Iztirob (Suffering) (1991)
Kuy avjida uzilmasin tor (Don't Let the Strings Brake While Playing) (1991)
Oʻrtada begona yoʻq (There is No Stranger in Between) (1991)
Yaxshidir achchiq haqiqat (The Bitter Truth is Better) (1992)
Qumursqalar jangi (Battle of the Ants) (1993)
Saylanma (Selected Works)
Birinchi jild: Ishq savdosi (Volume I: The Quest of Love) (2000)
Ikkinchi jild: Sheʼr dunyosi (Volume II: The World of Poetry) (2001)
Uchinchi jild: Umrim daryosi (Volume III: The River of My Life) (2001)
 Oʻzbegim (My Uzbek People) (2006) 
Orzuli dunyo (A World With Dreams) (2010)
Tabassum (Laughter) (2010)
Yangi sheʼrlar (New Poems) (2014)
Zamin sayyorasi (Planet Earth) (2014)
Inson (Human) (2015)
Saylanma (Selected Works)
Birinchi jild: Bahor tarovati (Volume I: The Freshness of the Spring) (2015)
Ikkinchi jild: Yoz harorati (Volume II: The Hot of the Summer) (2015)
Uchinchi jild: Kuz saxovati (Volume III: The Bounty of the Fall) (2016)
Toʻrtinchi jild: Qish halovati (Volume IV: The Quiet of the Winter) (2016)

 Sheʼrlar (Poems) (2016)
 Qiziquvchan Matmusa: Hajviyalar (Curios Matmusa: Tall Tales) (2017)
 Oʻzbegim (My Uzbek People) (2017) 
 Mening yulduzim (My Star) (2018)
 Qiziquvchan Matmusa (Curious Matmusa) (2018)
 Tanlangan asarlar (Selected Works) (2018)
 تاریخینگ دیر مینگ عصرلر ایچره پنهان اوزبیگیم (Tarixingdir ming asrlar ichra pinhon, oʻzbegim) (2017) (published in Afghanistan in the Arabic script)
 ارواحلر قوزغلانی (Arvohlar qoʻzgʻaloni (original title Ruhlar isyoni)) (2018) (published in Afghanistan in the Arabic script)
 Dilda ishq daryochadir ( I've Got Love Like a River in My Soul) (2019)
 Soʻz chamani (The Garden of Words) (2020)

Prose
 Adabiy portretlar (Literary Portraits) (1985) (co-author)
Shoiru, sheʼru shuur: Adabiy esselar (The Poet, the Poem, and the Mind: Literary Essays) (1987)
Saylanma (Selected Works)
Toʻrtinchi jild: Koʻngil nidosi (Volume IV: The Cry of the Heart) (2001)
Soʻz latofati (The Elegance of Words) (2014)
Saylanma (Selected Works)
Beshinchi jild: Qalb sadoqati (Volume V: The Loyalty of the Heart) (2018)
Oltinchi jild: Erk saodati (Volume VI: The Joy of Freedom) (2018)

Russian translations of his poems
Many of Vohidov's poems were translated into Russian. The following is a list of his poetry books that were published in Russian:
Лирика (Lyricism) (1970)
Стихи (Poems) (1974)
Узелок на память (A Knot to Remember) (1980)
Восстание бессмертных (The Rise of the Spirits) (1983)
 Линия жизни (The Line of Life) (1984)
В минуту песни не порвись, струна... (Don't Let the Strings Brake While Playing) (1986)

Literary translations
Vohidov translated the works of many famous foreign poets, such as Alexander Blok, Aleksandr Tvardovsky, Friedrich Schiller, Johann Wolfgang von Goethe, Lesya Ukrainka, Mikhail Svetlov, Muhammad Iqbal, Rasul Gamzatov, Sergey Yesenin, and Silva Kaputikyan into the Uzbek language. In particular, he translated Goethe's Faust into Uzbek in 1974. Especially noteworthy are his translations of Yesenin's works into Uzbek. Below is Vohidov's translation of Yesenin's farewell poem "Goodbye, my friend, goodbye" (1925):

Vohidov's own works in Uzbek have been translated into Russian, German, French, English, Urdu, Hindi, Arabic and many other Turkic languages. The Soviet poet Robert Rozhdestvensky thought very highly of Vohidov's work.

An example of Vohidov's original work follows (from his poem "Oʻzbegim/Ўзбегим" ("My Uzbek People"):

Poems set to music
Many of his poems have been turned into songs by Uzbek artists. Two of the most famous Vohidov poems that have become the lyrics to well-known Uzbek songs are "Inson" ("Human") and "Oʻzbegim" ("My Uzbek People"), both sung by Sherali Joʻrayev.

Legacy
Vohidov is one of the most beloved poets among Uzbeks. Many places and institutions in Uzbekistan are named after him. In 2018, a boarding school bearing his name was established in the city of Margilan. The following year the Erkin Vohidov museum opened its doors in Margilan.

Several books have been written on the life and works of Vohidov, including Erkin Vohidov saboqlari (Lessons by Erkin Vohidov) (2016), To quyosh sochgayki nur (As Long As the Sun Shines) (2016), Soʻz sehri (The Magic of Language), Oʻzbegimning Erkin oʻzbegi (The Erkin of My Uzbek People).

References

External links

Website dedicated to Vohidov's life and work    

1936 births
2016 deaths
People from Fergana Region
Uzbeks
20th-century Uzbekistani poets
Uzbekistani translators
Translators from Russian
Translators to Uzbek
Uzbekistani male poets
20th-century male writers
Translators of Johann Wolfgang von Goethe
People's Poets of Uzbekistan